The following lists events that happened during the year 2009 in Bosnia and Herzegovina.

Incumbents
Presidency:
Haris Silajdžić
Željko Komšić
Nebojša Radmanović
Prime Minister: Nikola Špirić

Events

October
October 15 – The United Nations General Assembly elects Bosnia and Herzegovina, Brazil, Gabon, Lebanon and Nigeria to serve two-year terms on the United Nations Security Council as non-veto-holding members.

December
December 13 – Rail service between Sarajevo and Belgrade resumes after an 18-year hiatus.

Deaths

December
2 December – Jozo Križanović, politician, member and chairman of the Presidency (b. 1944).

References

 
Years of the 21st century in Bosnia and Herzegovina
2000s in Bosnia and Herzegovina
Bosnia and Herzegovina
Bosnia and Herzegovina